Caplin may refer to:

Animals
 Capelin, a small forage fish also known as a caplin

People
 Alfred Gerald Caplin, better known as Al Capp (1909–1979), American cartoonist and humorist
 Andrew Caplin (born 1956), British-American economist
 Arnold S. Caplin (born 1929), American record producer
 Carole Caplin (born 1962), British health and wellness advisor and writer
 Elliot Caplin (1913–2000), American comic strip writer
 Ivor Caplin (born 1958), British politician
 Jean Caplin (1930–2014), British swimmer
 Lara Molins Caplin (born 1980), Irish cricketer
 Lee Caplin (born 1946), American entertainment executive
 Mortimer Caplin (1916–2019), American lawyer and educator
 Nathan Caplin (1891–1923), American gangster
 Nicholas Caplin (born 1958), former British Army officer
 Paul Caplin (born 1959), British entrepreneur and businessman
 Robert Caplin (born 1983), American photographer and cinematographer
 Roxey Ann Caplin (1793–1888), British writer and inventor
 Ruth Sacks Caplin (1904–2014), American screenwriter
 Sarah Caplin (born 1954), British television producer
 Tony Caplin (born 1951), British businessman
 William Caplin (born 1948), American music theorist

Places
 Caplin Bay, a natural bay in Newfoundland and Labrador, Canada
 Caplin Cove, Newfoundland and Labrador, Canada, a community

See also
 Chaplin (disambiguation)
 Coplin (disambiguation)